Octomeria ementosa is a species of orchid endemic to Brazil (Rio de Janeiro, Paraná).

References

External links 

ementosa
Endemic orchids of Brazil
Orchids of Rio de Janeiro (state)
Orchids of Paraná (state)